Kamil Maman is a Turkish journalist working in exile from Canada, originally a writer for the daily newspaper Bugün until it was seized by the Turkish government in 2015. In connection with the seizure, Maman was arrested and subject to torture by Turkish police. In Turkish media, all of which is more or less controlled by the state, he has been termed a "fugitive" as well as a "terrorist" and it has been claimed he is a member of the Gülen movement In 2018, his Patreon account was terminated after the Turkish government had threatened the San Francisco-based company to block the entire site in the country.

References 

21st-century Canadian journalists
21st-century Turkish journalists
Canadian male journalists
Canadian newspaper journalists
Date of birth missing (living people)
Living people
Turkish exiles
Turkish expatriates in Canada